Binyang may refer to:
 Binyang County, county in Guangxi, China
 9723 Binyang, minor planet